Yusuf Kenan Sönmez (1948 – 3 April 2020) was a Turkish politician.

He graduated from Istanbul Academy of Economics and Commercial Sciences, Department of Business Administration and Accounting. He worked as a manager in the private sector and engaged in free trade. In the 1987 election, he was elected as the representative of Istanbul from the Social Democratic Populist Party. Later, he served as the deputy chairman of the city of Istanbul and the delegate of the congress from the Republican People's Party. He was the founding chairman of Edremit Central District Agricultural Development Cooperative.

From 25 March 2020, he started receiving treatment at the Balıkesir State Hospital after he tested positive for coronavirus. On 3 April 2020, he died due to complications from COVID-19 at age 72. 

He was married and had one child.

References

1948 births
2020 deaths
Deaths from the COVID-19 pandemic in Turkey
Deputies of Istanbul
Turkish businesspeople
People from Zonguldak